"Sleep Tonight" is a song by  the Rolling Stones, from their 1986 album Dirty Work. It is the second song on the ten-track album where lead vocals are performed by Keith Richards, "Too Rude" being the first. This was the first time two songs sung by Richards appeared on a Rolling Stones album; since Dirty Work all their studio albums have included at least two tracks featuring Richards' lead vocals (except Blue & Lonesome).

Richards wrote the song (credited as a Jagger/Richards composition) on piano in the Paris recording studio's control room. Ronnie Wood liked the developing song and they recorded it together unaccompanied. Backing vocals and strings were added later. Wood played drums, since Charlie Watts wasn't present for the session, and Watts later said "he could not have done better."  Tom Waits, who had Richards guest on sessions for his Rain Dogs LP, plays piano.

Richards has stated that his singing during the Dirty Work sessions "thickened up" his voice: Since Jagger was absent from the studio much of the time, Richards provided guide vocals for many tracks and learned new microphone techniques. His sturdy but smokey vocal presence on "Sleep Tonight" foreshadows the strong and emotive singing on his solo records and later Rolling Stones tracks.

The song
"Sleep Tonight" is a piano-driven ballad, with a restrained string arrangement, a heavy drum beat and a gospel-like vocal arrangement. The song shows a maturing musician and songwriter, and is a bridge between the younger Richards "outlaw" songs and the soulful ballads he became known for on later Rolling Stones records like "Slipping Away" (Steel Wheels), "The Worst" and "Thru and Thru" (Voodoo Lounge), "How Can I Stop" (Bridges to Babylon) and "Losing My Touch" (Forty Licks).

References

The Rolling Stones songs
1985 songs
Songs written by Jagger–Richards
Song recordings produced by Steve Lillywhite
Song recordings produced by Jagger–Richards